Valentyn Volodymyrovych Didych  (born October 11, 1957, Volodarka Raion, Kyiv Oblast, Ukraine) is a Ukrainian politician and statesman. He served as a member of the 8th Ukrainian parliament, from November 2014 to July 2019.

Education
Didych studied at the Uman Agricultural Institute (now Uman National University of horticulture), graduating in 1980. In 2008, he received a degree from the Dniproperovsk Regional Institute of State Administration, part of the National Academy of State Administration.

Working Activity 
Didych served in the Red Army. Outside his political career, he is Director-General of the "Dar" vineyard. He was also the chairman of the Krynychky Raion State Administration, a regional authority in central Ukraine.

Public Activity 

Didych was deputy chairman of the Krynychky Region Committee from 1994 to 2010. Between 2006 and 2009, he was member of the political party "Our Ukraine" party, acting as a member of its governing committee. Between 2014 and 2019, he served as a member of the 8th Ukrainian Verkhovna Rada, the Ukrainian parliament, without party affiliation.

References

External links

 Facebook: Valentyn Didych

1957 births
Living people
Eighth convocation members of the Verkhovna Rada
People from Kyiv Oblast